Harry Bernard (January 13, 1878 – November 4, 1940) was an American actor and comedian best remembered for his appearance in numerous comedy films by Mack Sennett and Hal Roach.

Harry Bernard appeared in over 150 films between 1915 and 1940, usually typecast as a policeman. He played with Laurel & Hardy (25 films), Our Gang (nine films) and Charley Chase (33 films). The character actor also worked as a theatre and vaudeville actor. Bernard was born in San Francisco, California, and died of a heart attack in Hollywood in 1940. He was married to Jere Gerard Bernard (1886-1970); they had one daughter named Patricia.

Selected filmography

Bluff (1916)
Two Tars (1928, Short) - Truck Driver
Liberty (1929, Short) - Worker at Sea Food Dealer
Wrong Again (1929, Short) - Policeman
Night Owls (1930, Short) - Policeman (uncredited)
They Learned About Women (1930) - Baseball Spectator (uncredited)
The Rogue Song (1930) - Guard
Let's Go Native (1930) - Mover (uncredited)
Noche de duendes (1930) - Un pasajero (uncredited)
Another Fine Mess (1930, Short) - Policeman (uncredited)
Laughing Gravy (1930, Short) - Policeman (uncredited)
Pardon Us (1931) - Desk Sergeant (uncredited)
Shiver My Timbers (1931, Short) - Pirate
Any Old Port! (1932, Short) - Boxing Promoter (uncredited)
Birthday Blues (1932, Short) - Store proprietor
 Cheating Blondes (1933) - Tenement Neighbor (uncredited)
The Devil's Brother (1933) - Bandit / Drunk (uncredited)
Sons of the Desert (1933) - Bartender / Cop (uncredited)
Six of a Kind (1934) - Eyeshade Man (uncredited)
Our Daily Bread (1934) - Chief (uncredited)
Kentucky Kernels (1934) - Destitute Man (uncredited)
The Live Ghost (1934, Short) - Joe - Bartender (uncredited)
Ruggles of Red Gap (1935) - Harry - Bartender #2 (uncredited)
Stolen Harmony (1935) - Peanut Vendor (uncredited)
Hot Tip (1935) - Miller - Barber (uncredited)
The Rainmakers (1935) - Fireman (uncredited)
The Milky Way (1936) - Cop (uncredited)
The Bohemian Girl (1936) - Town Crier (uncredited)
Silly Billies (1936) - Prospector (uncredited)
Panic on the Air (1936) - Groundskeeper (uncredited)
Neighborhood House (1936) - Irate Moviegoer (uncredited)
Parole! (1936) - Workman (uncredited)
Kelly the Second (1936) - Andrews Man (uncredited)
Blackmailer (1936) - Gateman (uncredited)
36 Hours to Kill (1936) - Pullman Passenger (uncredited)
Swing Time (1936) - Second Stagehand (uncredited)
Our Relations (1936) - First Police Officer (uncredited)
Mr. Cinderella (1936) - Old Ford Driver (uncredited)
Killer at Large (1936) - Sexton (uncredited)
General Spanky (1936) - Minor Role (uncredited)
Let's Make a Million (1936) - Frisby
Counterfeit Lady (1936) - Harris (uncredited)
The Devil's Playground (1937) - Husband (uncredited)
Borderland (1937) - El Rio Bartender (uncredited)
Motor Madness (1937) - Proprietor of Hot Dog Stand (uncredited)
Way Out West (1937) - Man Eating at Bar (uncredited)
I Promise to Pay (1937) - Henchman (uncredited)
The Frame-Up (1937) - Henchman (uncredited)
North of the Rio Grande (1937) - Bartender Harry (uncredited)
New Faces of 1937 (1937) - Bridge Guard (uncredited)
It Can't Last Forever (1937) - Stock Swindle Victim (uncredited)
Carnival Queen (1937) - Advertising Man (uncredited)
Life Begins with Love (1937) - Tramp (uncredited)
Roll Along, Cowboy (1937) - Ranch Foreman Shep
The Shadow (1937) - Joey - Night Watchman
Goodbye Broadway (1938) - Asylum Guard (uncredited)
Juvenile Court (1938) - Hick in Drugstore (uncredited)
Girls' School (1938) - Kelsey - Campus Guard (uncredited)
The Spider's Web (1938, Serial) - Watchman (uncredited)
The Lady Objects (1938) - Janitor (uncredited)
Trade Winds (1938) - Sound Man (uncredited)
Homicide Bureau (1939) - Joe (uncredited)
Let Us Live (1939) - Auto Show Watchman (uncredited)
Mandrake the Magician (1939, Serial) - Construction Camp Watchman (uncredited)
Five Little Peppers and How They Grew (1939) - Caretaker (uncredited)
Konga, the Wild Stallion (1939) - Jury Foreman (uncredited)
A Chump at Oxford (1939) - Policeman Shot by Vandervere (uncredited)
Saps at Sea (1940) - Harbor Patrol Captain (final film role)

References

External links
 
 
 

1878 births
1940 deaths
American male film actors
Hal Roach Studios actors
20th-century American male actors
Burials at Hollywood Forever Cemetery
Our Gang